Harvey Barron (born 13 May 2003) is an English professional rugby league footballer who plays as a er for Hull F.C. in the Betfred Super League.

In 2022 he made his Hull début in the Super League against Toulouse Olympique.

References

External links
Hull FC profile

2003 births
Living people
English rugby league players
Hull F.C. players
Rugby league players from Kingston upon Hull
Rugby league wingers
Whitehaven R.L.F.C. players